Malhotra is an Indian surname of the Dhai Ghar sub-group of Khatris from Punjab. It is modified usage of Mehrotra.

Notable people

Administrators 

 Ajai Malhotra, Indian career diplomat who served as Ambassador of India to the Russian Federation. 
 Anna Rajam Malhotra, first female IAS officer of India
 G. C. Malhotra, former Secretary General of 12th Lok Sabha and 13th Lok Sabha
 Jagmohan Malhotra, former Governor of Jammu and Kashmir
 Maharaja Chandu Lal Malhotra, prime minister of Hyderabad and former military general in Khalsa Army.
 Neena Malhotra,  IFS officer and Indian Ambassador to Republic of San Marino
 R. N. Malhotra, Indian banker who served as the 17th governor of the Reserve Bank of India (RBI)
 Saloni Malhotra, CEO of DesiCrew

Army officers 

 Anoop Malhotra, Lieutenant General in Indian Army
 Om Prakash Malhotra, Former Chief of Indian Army
 Ravish Malhotra, an Indian air force pilot and astronaut

Artists 

 DJ Rekha (Rekha Malhotra), London based DJ and musician
 Jay Malhotra, guitarist in the rock band 'Rumour Cubes'
 Jhataleka Malhotra,2nd position in Femina Miss India 2014
 Karan Malhotra, director of Bollywood movie Agneepath
 Manish Malhotra, Indian celebrity fashion designer
 Namit Malhotra, Indian origin founder of VFX company 'DNEG' that has won Oscars for Interstellar, Ex Machina, Blade Runner 2049, First Man and Tenet.
 Punit Malhotra, director of the film "I Hate Luv Storys"
 Shaleen Malhotra, Indian VJ and actor

Athletes 

 Anastasia Malhotra, Indo-Japanese tennis player. She was ranked 449 in the world.
 Anmol Malhotra, Indian cricketer
 Ashok Malhotra, Indian cricketer
 Ishan Malhotra, Indian cricketer
 Jaskaran Malhotra, Indo-American cricketer who hit six sixes in one over.
 Manny Malhotra, Indo-Canadian hockey player
 O. P. Malhotra, Indian hockey player who was part of the Indian team that won gold at the 1956 Olympics.
 Reema Malhotra, Indian cricketer
 Manisha Malhotra, Indian tennis player. She was ranked 149 in the world..
 Vikram Malhotra, Indian professional squash player. He was ranked number 58 in the world.

Authors 

 Aanchal Malhotra, Indian author
 Rajiv Malhotra, Indian-American author and Hindutva Activist

Bollywood actors 
 Harshaali Malhotra, Indian child actress famous for playing "Munni" in Bajrangi Bhaijan
 Himmanshoo A. Malhotra,  Indian actor and winner of Nach Baliye 2015
 Pavan Malhotra, Indian actor
 Sanya Malhotra, Indian actress
 Sharad Malhotra, Indian actor
 Sidharth Malhotra, Indian Bollywood Actor

Businessmen 

 Aradhya Malhotra, co-founder of Skyless Game Studios
 Arjun Malhotra, co-founder of HCL Group and SPIC MACAY
 Dikesh Malhotra, Indo-Nepali Businessman and influencer
 Dina Nath Malhotra, Indian publisher and founder of Hind Pocket Books.
 Roshni Nadar Malhotra, Indian billionaire businesswoman

Doctors 

 Anil Kumari Malhotra,  Indian homoeopathic physician and the principal of Nehru Homoeopathic Medical College and Hospital of Delhi University
 Aseem Malhotra, British-Indian cardiologist
 Jaideep Malhotra,  India-based gynecologist, infertility specialist and an ace sonologist. 
 Raman Malhotra, British ophthalmologist and oculoplastic surgeon

Journalists 

 Inder Malhotra, Indian journalist with experience in editing for The Statesman and The Guardian 
 Vineet Malhotra,  Indian Television anchor and journalist working with NewsX as a prime time debate show host.

Judiciary 

 Anu Malhotra, judge in Delhi High Court
 Indu Malhotra Senior Counsel and former judge of Supreme Court of India
 Om Prakash Malhotra, Senior Advocate in the Supreme Court of India
 P. P. Malhotra, Senior Advocate in the Supreme Court of India

Politicians 

 Avtar Singh Malhotra, Punjabi politician belonging to the Communist Party of India
 Inder Jit Malhotra, member of the Lok Sabha representing the constituency of Jammu.
 Seema Malhotra, British Labour and Co-operative Party politician serving as the Member of Parliament for Feltham and Heston
 Smriti Malhotra Irani, Indian BJP politician
 Tara Singh Malhotra, Indian politician and activist.
 Usha Malhotra, Indian Congress politician 
 Vijay Kumar Malhotra,  Indian BJP politician and sport administrator

Scientists and academics 

 Ashok Malhotra, Indian professor
 Deepak Malhotra, economist
 Neil Malhotra, economist
 Renu Malhotra,  Indo-American planetary scientist, known for discovering minor planets
 Sangeeta Malhotra, Indian astrophysicist who studies galaxies. She works for NASA Goddard Space Flight Center.

Fictional characters 

 Giant-Man (Raz Malhotra), Marvel superhero

References

Surnames of Indian origin
Punjabi-language surnames
Khatri surnames
Khatri clans
Punjabi tribes
Hindu surnames
Indian surnames